Keith Butler is an Indian Australian writer. Born in Delhi in 1948, he began teaching in Calcutta and immigrated to Australia in 1972 before moving to New Zealand to teach in Palmerston North. He has been published in a variety of Australian publications including Meanjin and The Age. He won The Age Short Story Award in 1998 for his story "Sodasi". His first novel, The Secret Vindaloo, was published in 2014.

External links 
 A Streetcar Named Perspire
 Departure 11: ANN CURTHOYS + KEITH BUTLER

References 

1948 births
Australian male short story writers
Living people